STS-98 was a 2001 Space Shuttle mission to the International Space Station (ISS) flown by Space Shuttle  Atlantis. It was the first human spaceflight launch of the 21st century. STS-98 delivered to the station the Destiny Laboratory Module. All mission objectives were completed and the shuttle reentered and landed safely at Edwards Air Force Base on 20 February 2001, after twelve days in space, six of which were spent docked to the ISS.

Crew

Crew notes
Mark C. Lee was scheduled to fly as mission specialist 1 on his fifth trip to space, but due to undisclosed reasons, he was removed from this flight. His replacement was Robert Curbeam.

Launch attempts

Mission highlights

The crew continued the task of building and enhancing the International Space Station by delivering the U.S. Destiny Laboratory Module. It was the first NASA lab to be permanently used since the days of Skylab nearly three decades earlier. It was manufactured by Boeing at the Michoud Assembly Facility and the Marshall Space Flight Center in 1997. Upon transport to Kennedy Space Center's industrial buildings, it was fitted with equipment, machines, racks and cables at the Operations and Checkout Building and Space Station Processing Facility. It is made from stainless steel and aluminum, and comprises three cylindrical sections and two end-cones that contain the hatch openings through which astronauts enter and exit the module. The ends are colored blue and white respectively for the crew to navigate easily. A -diameter window is located on one side of the center module segment.

During the mission, the shuttle docked to PMA 3 located on the nadir of Node 1. The crew relocated PMA 2 to the holding area on the Z1 truss temporarily, before using the Shuttle's robotic arm to lift out the 14.5 ton steel module out of the Shuttle's payload bay, and permanently berthed it on the forward hatch of Node 1. Spacewalks conducted by Thomas Jones and Robert Curbeam reattached electrical cables to the stainless steel hull and connecting ports on Destiny, and also checked the laboratory's nadir window. PMA 2 was replaced to the forward hatch of Destiny.

The Shuttle spent six days docked to the station while the laboratory was attached and three spacewalks were conducted to complete its assembly. The mission also saw the 100th spacewalk in U.S. spaceflight history. STS-98 occurred while the first station crew was aboard the new space station.

Space walks

Wake-up calls 
NASA began a tradition of playing music to astronauts during the Gemini program, which was first used to wake up a flight crew during Apollo 15.
Each track is specially chosen, often by their families, and usually has a special meaning to an individual member of the crew, or is applicable to their daily activities.

Popular culture and media
STS-98 was the designation for the fictional NASA mission to destroy an asteroid in Armageddon (1998 film)

See also

 International Space Station
 List of human spaceflights
 List of International Space Station spacewalks
 List of Space Shuttle missions
 List of spacewalks and moonwalks 1965–1999
 Outline of space science

References

External links
 NASA mission summary 
 STS-98 Video Highlights 

Space Shuttle missions
Edwards Air Force Base
Spacecraft launched in 2001